The 2012 Australian Grand Prix (formally, the 2012 Formula 1 Qantas Australian Grand Prix) was a Formula One motor race held on 18 March 2012 as the opening round of the 2012 Formula One season. It was the 77th race in the combined history of the Australian Grand Prix that dates back to the 100 Miles Road Race of 1928, and the 17th time the event has been held at the Melbourne Grand Prix Circuit at Albert Park.

The 58-lap race was won by McLaren driver Jenson Button who took his third victory at the Albert Park Circuit. Reigning double World Champion Sebastian Vettel, driving for Red Bull Racing, finished in second place, while polesitter and Button's McLaren teammate Lewis Hamilton completed the podium.

Australian Mark Webber was fourth, his best result in his home Grand Prix. Webber's fourth place was the best finish by an Australian in an Australian Grand Prix since Alfredo Costanzo finished fourth in 1984, the last time the race was run under Australian domestic rules before becoming a round of the World Championship in 1985.

Report

Background

With Vitantonio Liuzzi unable to secure a seat for 2012 and Jarno Trulli being replaced at Caterham during the pre-season, the race was the first Grand Prix since the 1973 German Grand Prix not to feature an Italian driver on the grid. It was also the first Grand Prix to feature six current and former Formula One World Champions taking part in the race. It was the first Australian Grand Prix to feature two Australians on the grid.

After using one Drag Reduction System (DRS) zone in 2011, the circuit featured two zones for the 2012 race. These were located along the main straight and between Turns 2 and 3, with a single detection point for both zones—similar to the format trialled at the  Canadian and European Grands Prix—located at the entry to Turn 14. Other modifications to the circuit included the introduction of thicker, spongier astroturf on the exit of several corners to discourage drivers from driving beyond the limits of the circuit.

Mercedes were the subject of an investigation by the scrutineers over the use of a "radical" rear wing concept on the F1 W03. Charlie Whiting, the FIA's technical delegate, examined the car on the Thursday before the race and declared it to be legal.

HRT experienced problems with the #22 chassis to be driven by Pedro de la Rosa on Thursday. Having completed a shakedown of the car to be driven by Narain Karthikeyan in Barcelona just two weeks before the Australian Grand Prix, the team were unable to complete work on de la Rosa's car in time for scrutineering on Thursday afternoon. The team requested a delay to the scrutineering process, with the FIA agreeing and allowing HRT until 11am local time to work on the car before presenting it to race stewards. The team ultimately passed scrutineering, allowing de la Rosa to take part in practice and the race, but they failed to have the car ready on time to take part in the first session.

Several drivers made their Formula One debut along with others taking part in their first Australian Grand Prix as full-time drivers. The French duo of Charles Pic and Jean-Éric Vergne made their Formula One debut driving for Marussia and Toro Rosso respectively. While Swiss-born Frenchman Romain Grosjean and Perth-born Australian Daniel Ricciardo came to Australia for the first time as full-time drivers for Lotus and Toro Rosso respectively, Grosjean had last raced in Abu Dhabi for the Renault F1 team in 2009 as teammate to Fernando Alonso. Ricciardo had never raced at his home Grand Prix.

Tyre supplier Pirelli brought its white-banded medium compound tyre as the harder "prime" tyre and the yellow-banded soft compound as the softer "option" compound, whereas the previous year the "prime" compound was the silver-banded hard compound tyre.

Free practice

The first hour of the first practice session saw very little running, as the circuit was considered too wet for slick tyres, but too dry for intermediates. Consequently, most drivers only completed installation laps in the first hour, before emerging later in the session once a dry line began to appear. Kamui Kobayashi and the Mercedes pair of Nico Rosberg and Michael Schumacher set the pace, which was briefly interrupted by Karthikeyan's HRT cutting out on the approach to Turn 13, the engine automatically shutting itself off when the oil overheated. With de la Rosa's car not yet ready to take to the circuit, HRT finished the session without recording a single lap time. On his return to Formula One, Kimi Räikkönen experienced technical problems that limited him to just eight laps – later described by team personnel as making adjustments to the steering rack – while Felipe Massa spun out at Turn 9. Jenson Button finished the session fastest, with a late lap from Lewis Hamilton enough for second, and Schumacher half a second slower in third. Reigning World Champion Sebastian Vettel ultimately finished the session eleventh overall.

Rain between the first and second session meant that the circuit was declared wet at the start of the second Friday session, with the water washing away the rubber than had been laid down by the first session and support events. The Scuderia Toro Rosso drivers were the first out, gathering data on the performance on wet tyres. A dry line began to appear after forty minutes, and it was Sergio Pérez who set the first representative time of the day. The final fifteen minutes of the session were dominated by drivers running on the soft tyres, with Michael Schumacher besting Nico Hülkenberg's fastest time by one tenth of a second on his final lap. Several drivers, including Heikki Kovalainen, Mark Webber and Pastor Maldonado went off the circuit, but the session passed without interruption. Kamui Kobayashi spun at the final corner and narrowly avoided the wall, whilst Narain Karthikeyan once again came to a halt on the circuit, this time at Turn 6 after the session had ended. With the team having successfully completed his car in time for the second session, Pedro de la Rosa was further paralysed by hydraulics issues.

The third session was warm and sunny (21 °C air temp, 29 °C track temp) and stayed much the same for the remainder of the weekend, allowing for significant running by all teams. Nico Rosberg and Michael Schumacher were once again the early leaders before Romain Grosjean set the fastest time in the final twenty minutes, only to be surpassed by Lewis Hamilton in the final minute. There was much attention given to Red Bull Racing, following team principal Christian Horner's claims that the team had not done any qualifying simulations. Their plans were thrown into disarray when Sebastian Vettel spun off at Turn 5 shortly after switching to soft tyres, and Mark Webber's fastest lap was ruined when Michael Schumacher spun off at Turn 9. Pedro de la Rosa managed to set his first timed lap of the weekend, but was forced to return to the pits with power steering problems. Projected lap times at the end of the session suggested that HRT would fail to qualify for the race for the second consecutive year.

Qualifying

As a result of a six-car pile-up in a V8 Supercars support race held shortly after FP3, the exit of Turn 3 was covered with sand and fire-retardant foam. The accident resulted in a twenty-five-minute delay to the restart of the race, and although commentators noted that the cars would move the debris off the racing line, the shortened race format meant that sand was still visible on the circuit at the start of qualifying.

The first qualifying period was marked by heavy traffic, with several drivers cited for blocking. Chief among them was Narain Karthikeyan, who impeded other, faster cars on three separate occasions. The expected running order was soon shaken up as the session ended with Kamui Kobayashi fastest ahead of Jean-Éric Vergne and Sergio Pérez. Felipe Massa was in danger of being eliminated until a late lap secured his place in Q2. When the chequered flag fell, it was Kimi Räikkönen who found himself in eighteenth place and eliminated from qualifying. Räikkönen ran wide on the exit of Turn 12, glancing the sandtrap and compromising his final flying lap. Heikki Kovalainen and Vitaly Petrov finished in nineteenth and twentieth respectively, ahead of Marussia drivers Timo Glock and Charles Pic, both of whom were comfortably inside the 107% margin. The HRTs of Pedro de la Rosa and Karthikeyan were not, however; de la Rosa was 1.2 seconds away from the cut-off, while Karthikeyan was 1.4 seconds short.

The second period was marked by a second shock elimination, the Ferrari of Fernando Alonso. Five minutes into the period, Alonso crossed the outer edge of the circuit in the braking zone for the first turn and spun into the gravel. As he was unable to return his car to the circuit under its own power, he was prevented from taking any further part in the session. Consequently, the session was red flagged for approximately four minutes while his car was removed; eight minutes and twenty-two seconds remained on the clock for the session. He had been placed third at the time, but gradually fell down the order and was eliminated, ultimately qualifying in twelfth behind Vergne. Felipe Massa in the sole remaining Ferrari could do no better than sixteenth, culminating in Ferrari's first failure to advance at least one car to Q3 (in a dry qualifying session) since the 2009 Abu Dhabi Grand Prix. Conversely, Daniel Ricciardo and Romain Grosjean both reached Q3 for the first time in their respective careers. Despite setting the early pace in Q1, Kamui Kobayashi was unable to duplicate his time and finished thirteenth, ahead of Bruno Senna and Paul di Resta in fifteenth. Kobayashi's teammate Pérez did not set a time during the period owing to a gearbox fault, and so finished the session in seventeenth. At the conclusion of Q2, Rosberg set the fastest time of the weekend so far to lead an all Mercedes powered top four with Schumacher, Hamilton and Button following.

The final period began with Rosberg and Schumacher attempting to set a time on used soft tyres. Rosberg made an early mistake, and while Schumacher briefly held provisional pole, he was soon unseated by Hamilton. Hamilton's time, the first and only lap of the weekend under one minute and twenty-five seconds, would remain unchallenged for the remainder of the period, despite a late effort from teammate Jenson Button. Button ultimately finished a tenth of a second behind Hamilton, locking out the front row of the grid; the result was the first time since the 1995 Australian Grand Prix that two British drivers occupied the front row of the grid, and the first time since the 2010 Italian Grand Prix in which a Red Bull car failed to qualify on the front row of the grid. Schumacher's second flying lap was set on fresh rubber, and while he initially looked set to take third place, he had to settle for fourth after a surprise lap from Romain Grosjean placed the Lotus driver behind Button. Mark Webber qualified fifth ahead of reigning World Champion Sebastian Vettel, who deliberately left his pit garage last so as to set the final time of the session, a habit he developed during the 2011 season. However, his final flying lap was not enough for anything more than sixth place, eight-tenths of a second behind Hamilton. After making a mistake on his first flying lap, Rosberg made a second error while running on fresh tyres, and qualified seventh, with Pastor Maldonado in eighth and Nico Hülkenberg in ninth. Daniel Ricciardo finished tenth overall, having elected not to complete a timed lap.

Post-qualifying
Both HRT cars failed to qualify within 107% of the fastest time set in Q1. Consequently, both cars failed to qualify for the race. Despite team principal Luis Pérez-Sala's prediction that the team would be unlikely to qualify for the race (and that they may not be able to qualify for the Malaysian Grand Prix), the team requested a special dispensation to race from the stewards on the grounds that, as both cars were not fully prepared to take part in the Grand Prix until the final practice session, the times set during qualifying were not fully representative of the car's ability to qualify for the race. The FIA later confirmed that neither car would be granted permission to start the race, meaning that the team failed to qualify for the Australian Grand Prix for the second consecutive year.

Several drivers, including Narain Karthikeyan, Fernando Alonso and Daniel Ricciardo were called before the stewards to answer to charges of blocking during the first qualifying period. However, no action was taken against any driver.

Despite Mercedes' rear wing concept being declared legal on Thursday, representatives from Red Bull Racing and Lotus F1 approached the race stewards and requested that the FIA review the original verdict after qualifying, claiming that the front wing system was in violation of Articles 3.15 and 3.18, which govern the use of DRS and driver-operated aerodynamic devices.

Race

Jenson Button made the better start away from the line, leading the field into the first corner. Lewis Hamilton slotted in behind him in second place. Romain Grosjean was overwhelmed at the first corner and fell from third to sixth, while Mark Webber fell down the order after making contact and getting sandwiched in between Jean-Éric Vergne and Nico Hülkenberg. The contact was heavy enough to end Hülkenberg's race. Additionally, at the first corner Sergio Pérez, after gaining several positions from at the start, was unable to avoid the rear wing of his Sauber teammate, Kamui Kobayashi, leaving Kobayashi's rear wing damaged for the remainder of the race. Meanwhile, Bruno Senna's Williams was turned sideways with two wheels airborne above Daniel Ricciardo's front wing, as a consequence both cars pitted on lap 1 leaving them effectively last in 19th and 20th respectively. Michael Schumacher and Nico Rosberg settled into third and fourth before Rosberg was passed by Vettel. Grosjean made contact with Pastor Maldonado at Turn 13, the impact snapping Grosjean's steering arm and retiring the French driver on the spot. Fernando Alonso clawed his way up from twelfth to seventh. The minor placing benefited from the retirement of Schumacher on lap 10, when he ran wide across the run-off outside Turn 1 as he tried to nurse a gearbox problem, and he was seen limping down the approach to Turn 3. This left Vettel, who had been quickly catching Schumacher, in third place behind the two McLarens.

The first round of stops began with Felipe Massa on lap 14, the Ferrari driver complaining of a loss of grip in his rear tyres. Several other drivers pitted around the same time, foreshadowing a switch to a three-stop strategy. Meanwhile, Sergio Pérez went in the opposite direction; having started the race on the harder prime tyre, the Mexican driver stayed out longer than anyone else, once again aiming for the one-stop strategy he had used throughout the 2011 season. Button briefly yielded the race lead to Lewis Hamilton, but immediately took it back when Hamilton pitted on the very next lap. Hamilton's stop was significant as he emerged behind Pérez, who was matching Button's pace despite his older and harder tyres. This would ultimately leave Hamilton vulnerable to the third-placed Vettel. A radio transmission from Räikkönen broadcast where he asked why the blue light was flashing on his steering wheel. There was actually a problem with the computer program controlling the blue flags during the race. Jenson Button was getting some as well, and his race engineer confirmed that there was a slight malfunction on the race organizer's end.

Due to a steering problem, Vitaly Petrov retired his Caterham on the start/finish straight beside the pit wall. The position of the car was dangerous so the safety car was deployed on lap 37 to allow a truck to recover it. This led to a round of pit stops which, significantly, allowed Vettel to take second place from Hamilton. With the new rules allowing lapped cars to unlap themselves, Button now had to contend with Vettel, Hamilton, Webber and Alonso behind him. With the safety car returning to the pits after lap 41, Button opened up a three-second gap at the restart. Hamilton was unable to overtake Vettel for second place, and fell into the clutches of Webber in fourth. Pastor Maldonado harried Alonso for fifth, with a radio transmission from the Ferrari pit revealing that Alonso's tyres were quickly degrading. Maldonado was unable to find a way past Alonso, and ultimately crashed out on the final lap when he applied too much throttle too soon while still on the astroturf through the apex of turn 7. As a result of pushing hard in pursuit of Alonso and ten world championship points, his Williams was forced into a spin which he could not correct. He made heavy contact with the wall, but was not injured, and was ultimately classified thirteenth as he had completed 90% of the race distance.

Further down the order, Felipe Massa made contact with Bruno Senna at Turn 3, with the Ferrari and Williams continuing on for some distance as they tried to untangle themselves from one another. Both cars developed punctures, and retired from the race as a result. Senna was able to remain out on the circuit long enough to complete 90% of the race distance, and he was classified sixteenth as a result.

Jenson Button went on to win the race, his third at the Albert Park Circuit in four years. Vettel crossed the line second, two seconds behind Button, while Hamilton held Webber off long enough to finish third. Webber crossed the line fourth, his best result at his home Grand Prix. Maldonado's accident meant that Fernando Alonso finished the race a lonely fifth, with Kamui Kobayashi scoring eight points for sixth place.

Going into the final lap of the race, Pérez in seventh led Rosberg ahead of Räikkönen – who had recovered from seventeenth on the grid to be running ninth – and Jean-Éric Vergne, Daniel Ricciardo and Paul di Resta. Rosberg made contact with Pérez on the approach to the fast chicane at turns 11 and 12, allowing Räikkönen to overtake both of them. Vergne made a mistake at turn 13, opening the door for di Resta and Ricciardo to pass him, and the two fought over ninth place in a fierce sprint to the line. In fact, the racing was so unpredictable 8th to 11th position was separated by less than 0.4s. Räikkönen finished seventh ahead of Pérez (who like last year managed to complete the race with only a single pitstop), with Ricciardo finishing ninth ahead of di Resta in tenth, leaving Vergne to settle for eleventh. Rosberg, who had a left rear puncture from his earlier contact with Pérez, limped to the line in twelfth, twenty seconds behind Vergne. Maldonado's accident left him thirteenth, with Timo Glock in the sole surviving Marussia in fourteenth and one lap down on the leader.

Classification

Qualifying

Notes
 — Sergio Pérez took a five-place grid penalty for a gearbox change.
 — Pedro de la Rosa and Narain Karthikeyan failed to set a lap time within 107% of the fastest time recorded in Q1. As a result, both cars failed to qualify for the race.

Race

Heikki Kovalainen was given a five-place grid penalty at the next race for overtaking cars on a restart prior to passing the safety car line.

Championship standings after the race

Drivers' Championship standings

Constructors' Championship standings

 Note: Only the top five positions are included for both sets of standings.

See also 
 2012 V8 Supercars Albert Park Challenge

References

External links 

Australian
Australian Grand Prix
Grand Prix
Grand Prix